Igor Tkalčević (born 26 November 1974) is a retired Croatian football defender. His professional career spanned over two decades. During this time he mainly played for clubs in Croatia's Prva HNL, with two stints in China.

Honours
Rijeka
Croatian Cup: 2005, 2006

References

1974 births
Living people
Sportspeople from Vinkovci
Croatian footballers
Croatian expatriate footballers
Croatian Football League players
NK Osijek players
HNK Cibalia players
HNK Rijeka players
NK Međimurje players
Beijing Hongdeng players
Chengdu Tiancheng F.C. players
NK Opatija players
Chinese Super League players
China League One players
Expatriate footballers in China
Croatian expatriate sportspeople in China
HNK Rijeka non-playing staff
Association football defenders
Croatian football managers
Expatriate football managers in Syria